Royal Air Force , more commonly known as RAF  ICAO EDUL (from 1 January 1995 ETUL) was a Royal Air Force station, a military airfield, located in Germany on its border with the Netherlands.

The site now operates as the civilian Weeze Airport, in the Lower Rhine region of Germany. The airport also happens to be less commonly known as Niederrhein Airport.

History
The British army built Advanced Landing Ground Goch (B-100) during the Second World War in preparation for the final push across the Rhine River in early 1945. The infrastructure was straightforward and simple: a  PSP runway with a parallel  grass emergency runway, refuelling was done with jerrycans, and there was enough space for two complete Wings.

It was only used between 4 March and late April. The first unit to fly from the airfield was No. 662 Squadron RAF operating Taylorcraft Auster, who remained at the airfield until 24 March. They were followed by the British 121 Wing (20 March), operating the Hawker Typhoon. Ten days later the Canadian No. 143 Wing joined them. The Hawker Typhoons of 121 Wing were exchanged for the Supermarine Spitfires of Canadian No. 127 Wing by mid-April, but by the end of that month all Wings had left. This ended the use of B-100 airfield.

In 1954 Royal Air Force Germany (RAFG) rebuilt the Second World War  airfield, with a  runway, as RAF Laarbruch due to the outbreak of the Cold War. Laarbruch was home to various first-line squadrons, including No. 2 Squadron RAF flying the McDonnell Douglas F-4 Phantom FGR.2 and later the SEPECAT Jaguars; and 15 and 16 Squadrons flying Blackburn Buccaneer S.2Bs. These squadrons all moved onto the Panavia Tornado with four squadrons (2, 15, 16,and 20) resident. 25 Squadron's 'C' Flight was also located at Laarbruch, equipped with the Bristol Bloodhound surface to air missile system.

After the first Gulf War, many of the squadrons were relocated, No. 2 Sqn going back to RAF Marham; and 15, 16, and 20 becoming reserve squadrons. When RAF Gütersloh closed, the British Aerospace Harrier GR.5 of No. 3 Squadron RAF and No. 4 Squadron RAF squadrons moved in along with the helicopters of 18(B) Squadron. Laarbruch was also home to 1 and 26 Squadron RAF Regiment. 18 Squadron returned to RAF Odiham in 1997 with the remaining Harrier squadrons departing to RAF Cottesmore in 1999.

After closing in 1999 the airfield found a new civilian lease of life as the budget airline airport Flughafen Niederrhein (Lower Rhine Airport), now known as Weeze Airport after the nearest large settlement. Civil operations began in May 2003.

Laarbruch squadrons
No. 2 Squadron RAF; flying Phantom FGR.2 up to 1976 and the SEPECAT Jaguar GR.1A/T.2A from 1976 until the 1980s, then the Panavia Tornado GR.1/1A from the late 1980s until the unit was re-located to RAF Marham in 1991.
No. 3 Squadron RAF; flying English Electric Canberra B(I).8 1968–72, from 1992 until 1999 with the BAe Harrier GR.5A, then Harrier GR.7 until the unit was re-located to RAF Cottesmore in 1999.
No 4 Squadron RAF; flying the BAE Harrier GR.7 version from 1992 until the unit was re-located to RAF Cottesmore in 1999.
No. 5 Squadron RAF; flying Gloster Javelin FAW.5 1959–62.
No. 15 Squadron RAF; flying the Blackburn Buccaneer S.2 from the 1970s until conversion to the Panavia Tornado GR.1/1A in 1983 until 1991.
No. 16 Squadron RAF; flying English Electric Canberra B(I).8 1958–72, Blackburn Buccaneer S.2 1972–83, Panavia Tornado GR.1/A 1983–91
No. 18 Squadron RAF; flying Boeing Chinook HC.1 helicopters 1992–97, HC.2 conversion started on 1 February 1994.
No. 20 Squadron RAF; flying Panavia Tornado GR.1/1A 1984–92
No. 31 Squadron RAF; flying English Electric Canberra PR.7 1955–71
No. 68 Squadron RAF; flying Gloster Meteor NF.11 (1957–59) until reformation as No.5 Squadron flying Gloster Javelin.
No. 69 Squadron RAF; flying English Electric Canberra PR.3 1954–58.
No. 79 Squadron RAF; flying Gloster Meteor FR.9 (54–55)
No. 80 Squadron RAF; flying English Electric Canberra PR.7 1955–57.
No. 25 Squadron RAF C Flight; Bristol Bloodhound II missiles
No. 1 Squadron RAF Regiment
No. 26 Squadron RAF Regiment with Rapier missiles
 Security Squadron RAF Police supplied on and off station security and Policing duties.
 L Troop, 220 Signal Squadron, 21st Signal Regiment (Air Support)
 10 Field Squadron RAF(G) Support Royal Engineers
 50 Field (Construction) Squadron Royal Engineers

See also
List of former Royal Air Force stations
List of Royal Air Force aircraft squadrons

References

Citations

Bibliography

  RAF Laarbruch

 Johnson, David C. (1988), U.S. Army Air Forces Continental Airfields (ETO), D-Day to V-E Day; Research Division, USAF Historical Research Center, Maxwell AFB, Alabama.

External links
Royal Air Force Museum Laarbruch Weeze
More information about RAF Laarbruch
Station Commanders 1954–1999
Laarbruch Flying Club

Laarbruch
Buildings and structures in North Rhine-Westphalia
1999 disestablishments in Germany
Military units and formations disestablished in 1999
Airports in North Rhine-Westphalia